The Mała Panew is a river in south-western Poland, Silesian and Opole Voivodeships. It is a right tributary of the Oder, merging with the Oder near the village of Czarnowąsy near Opole. The Bziniczka is a tributary to the Mala Panew.

The length of the Mała Panew is 132 km; the area of the watershed is 2132 km2.

References 

Rivers of Poland
Rivers of Silesian Voivodeship
Rivers of Opole Voivodeship